Carolyn Ann Woods (born June 24, 1955) is an American former competition swimmer.

At the age of 17, Woods represented the United States at the 1972 Summer Olympics in Munich, Germany.  She competed in the women's 200-meter individual medley, and finished eighth in the event final with a time of 2:27.42.

See also
 List of University of Arizona people

References

1955 births
Living people
American female medley swimmers
Arizona Wildcats women's swimmers
Olympic swimmers of the United States
Sportspeople from Long Beach, California
Swimmers at the 1972 Summer Olympics
20th-century American women